Ralph Robinson (1520–1577) was an English scholar and man of letters. He is best known for his English translation of Sir Thomas More's Utopia, originally written in Latin in 1516.

Life
Robinson was educated at Stamford School, Lincolnshire and Corpus Christi College, Oxford. At school he was a contemporary of William Cecil later Lord Burghley, Lord High Treasurer of England and chief adviser to Queen Elizabeth I, and the foreword of his translation, which is dedicated to Burghley, alludes to their school-days together.

He graduated B.A. in 1540, and was elected fellow of his college Corpus on 16 June 1542. In March 1544 he supplicated for the degree of M.A. Coming to London, he obtained the livery of the Goldsmiths' Company, and a small post as clerk in the service of his early friend, Cecil. From a poor background, he was long hampered by the poverty of the rest of his family.

Utopia translation
Robinson's translation Utopia was originally published in 1551, with a second, revised, edition published in 1556. The book was published by Abraham Veal, at the sign of the Lamb in St. Paul's Churchyard, in 1551. The second edition appeared without the dedicatory letter. The third edition is dated 1597, and the 'newly corrected' fourth of 1624 is dedicated by the publisher, Bernard Alsop, to Cresacre More. Subsequent translators were Gilbert Burnet (1684) and Arthur Cayley (1808).

From the section Of Lawes Not Made According to Equitie:

References

External links
 
 

Alumni of Corpus Christi College, Oxford
English Renaissance humanists
Fellows of Corpus Christi College, Cambridge
English non-fiction writers
People educated at Stamford School
1520 births
1577 deaths
16th-century English writers
16th-century male writers
16th-century translators
16th-century scholars
English male non-fiction writers